The 11th Army was an army of the Red Army, formed four times. The first formation was a unit of the then newly created Soviet armed forces. It was formed by the Bolsheviks on October 3, 1918, from the Red Northern Caucasus Army. In February 1919 it was dissolved and was again deployed in March 1919 as a subdivision of the Caspian-Caucasian Front. It took a prominent part in the sovietization of the three republics of the southern Caucasus in 1920–21, when Azerbaijan, Armenia, and Georgia were brought within the orbit of Soviet Russia. In 1939 the 11th Army (2nd formation) was formed in the Belarusian Special Military District (BSMD) from the former Minsk Army Group. It fought in the Soviet invasion of Poland, the Baltic Operation, the Demyansk Pocket, and the Battle of Kursk. The army disbanded in December 1943.

Russian Civil War

World War Two
In 1939 the 11th Army (2nd formation) was formed in the Belarusian Special Military District (BSMD) from the former Minsk Army Group. It took part in the Soviet invasion of Poland (1939). In summer 1940 it became part of the Baltic Military District (from August, 17th, 1940 the Baltic Special military district).

When the Germans invaded in June 1941 the 11th Army comprised the 16th Rifle Corps (which included the 5th, 33rd and 188th Rifle Divisions) and 29th Rifle Corps (179th and 184th Rifle Divisions) and the 3rd Mechanised Corps (640 tanks), the 23rd, 126th and 128th Rifle Divisions, the 42nd (Siauliai) and 46th Fortified Regions (Telsiai), and 45th Fortified Regions (УР), and other smaller formations and units. It participated in military operations as part of the Soviet Northwestern Front west and south-western of Kaunas and Vilnius.

Since July 9, 1941, it had under its command the 41st and 22nd Rifle Corps and the 1st Mechanised Corps. On 1 September 1941 its structure included the 180th, 182nd, 183rd, 202nd, and 254th Rifle Divisions, 21st Motor Rifle Regiment, 9th Anti-Tank Artillery Brigade, 614th Corps Artillery Regiment, 698th Anti-Tank Artillery Regiment, the 87th and 110th Independent Tank Battalions, 7th Mixed Aviation Division, and a number of separate formations. 

In 1942 and 1943 it participated in attacks against the Wehrmacht near Solzy and Staraya Russa and in operations around the Demyansk Pocket. In summer and fall 1943 it was part of the Western Front. In mid July 1943 the Army comprised the 53rd Rifle Corps, the 4th, 96th, 260th, 273rd and 323rd Rifle Division, the 225th Tank Regiment and other units. From July 30 11th Army joined the Bryansk Front, and fought in the Battle of Kursk.
In December 1943 the 11th Army was dissolved, with the personnel being integrated into other Soviet armies.

The commanders of the 11th Army were:
 Nikifor Medvedev (07.09.1939 - 26.07.1940) 
 Vasili Morozov (26.07.1940 - 18.11.1942)
 Pavel Kurochkin (18.11.1942 - 15.03.1943)
 Anton Lopatin (15.03.1943 - 14.07.1943)
 Ivan Fedyuninsky (14.07.1943 - 23.12.1943)

References

External links
 Orbat.com/Niehorster, Order of Battle, 22 June 1941

011
20th century in Azerbaijan
20th century in Georgia (country)
Military units and formations established in 1918
Military units and formations disestablished in 1943
20th century in Armenia
1918 establishments in Russia
Military units and formations of the Soviet invasion of Poland